Friolzheimer Riese (German for Giant of Friolzheim) is the designation of a  tall lattice tower on Geissberg, a mountain northeast of Friolzheim, Baden-Württemberg, Germany. 

Until 2003 it was used as radio relay for the US military (during its final use as a US facility, as part of the Defense Information Systems Network) in Germany. The tower is now used for non-military communication. 

A special feature of it are the four large concrete basements on which its four legs stand.

Communication towers in Germany
Military installations of the United States in Germany